Nanobagrus is a genus of bagrid catfishes found in Southeast Asia.  All species are quite small fish.

Species 
There are currently seven described species in this genus:
 Nanobagrus armatus (Vaillant, 1902)
 Nanobagrus fuscus (Popta, 1904)
 Nanobagrus immaculatus H. H. Ng, 2008
 Nanobagrus lemniscatus H. H. Ng, 2010.
 Nanobagrus nebulosus H. H. Ng & H. H. Tan, 1999
 Nanobagrus stellatus H. H. Tan & H. H. Ng, 2000
 Nanobagrus torquatus A. W. Thomson, J. A. López, Hadiaty & Page, 2008

References

Bagridae
Fish of Asia
Fish of Indonesia
Freshwater fish genera
Catfish genera